Thomas Richard Hardman (3 December 1990 – 28 November 2012) was an English cricketer. Hardman was a right-handed batsman who bowled right-arm medium-fast. He was born in Bury, Greater Manchester and was educated at St Joseph's RC High School, Heywood and Holy Cross College, Bury.

Following a back injury which required him to be placed in a brace for three months in 2010, he began playing Second XI cricket for the Lancashire Second XI.  While studying Sports and Exercise Sciences at Leeds Metropolitan University, Hardman made two first-class appearances for Leeds/Bradford MCCU in 2012 against Surrey at The Oval and Yorkshire at Headingley. He scored a total of 65 runs in his two matches, with a high score of 44 against Yorkshire. With the ball, he took 3 wickets at an average of 59.66, with best figures of 2/51. He also played a number of Second XI matches for Leeds/Bradford MCCU during the 2012 season.

Hardman was found dead in his house in Leeds, Yorkshire, on 28 November 2012. He had earlier been named as the Leeds/Bradford MCCU captain for the 2013 season.

References

External links
Tom Hardman at ESPNcricinfo
Tom Hardman at CricketArchive

1990 births
2012 deaths
Cricketers from Bury, Greater Manchester
People educated at Holy Cross College
Alumni of Leeds Beckett University
English cricketers
Leeds/Bradford MCCU cricketers